Ealing Studios is a television and film production company and facilities provider at Ealing Green in West London. Will Barker bought the White Lodge on Ealing Green in 1902 as a base for film making, and films have been made on the site ever since. It is the oldest continuously working studio facility for film production in the world, and the current stages were opened for the use of sound in 1931.

It is best known for a series of classic films produced in the post-WWII years, including Kind Hearts and Coronets (1949), Passport to Pimlico (1949), The Lavender Hill Mob (1951), and The Ladykillers (1955).  The BBC owned and filmed at the Studios for forty years from 1955 until 1995.

Since 2000, Ealing Studios has resumed releasing films under its own name, including the revived St Trinian's franchise. In more recent times, films shot here include  The Importance of Being Earnest (2002) and Shaun of the Dead (2004), as well as The Theory of Everything (2014), The Imitation Game (2014), Burnt (2015) and Devs (miniseries) (2020). Interior scenes of the British period drama television series Downton Abbey were shot in Stage 2 of the studios. The Met Film School London operates on the site.

History

Film studios (1902–1955) 
The site was first occupied by Will Barker Studios from 1902. From 1929, it was acquired by theatre producer Basil Dean, who founded Associated Talking Pictures Ltd. He was joined on the management level by Stephen Courtauld and Reginald Baker. In 1931, they built Ealing Studios, transferring all production there in December of that year. When Dean left in 1938 to be replaced by Michael Balcon from MGM, about 60 films had been made at the studios. Balcon discontinued the ATP name and began to issue films under the Ealing Studios name. In 1944, the company was taken over by the Rank Organisation.

In the 1930s and 1940s, the facility as ATP and then Ealing Studios produced many comedies with stars such as Gracie Fields, George Formby, Stanley Holloway and Will Hay, who had established their reputations in other spheres of entertainment. The company was also instrumental in the use of documentary film-makers to make more realistic war films. These included Went the Day Well? (1942), The Foreman Went to France (1942), Undercover (1943), and San Demetrio London (1943). In 1945, the studio made its chiller compendium Dead of Night.

In the post-war period, the company embarked on a series of comedies which became the studio's hallmark. These were often lightly satirical and were seen to reflect aspects of British character and society. The first was Hue and Cry (1947) and the last Barnacle Bill (1956).

The best remembered Ealing films were produced between 1948 and 1955: Whisky Galore! (1949), Passport to Pimlico (1949), Kind Hearts and Coronets (1949), The Lavender Hill Mob (1951), The Man in the White Suit (1951), The Titfield Thunderbolt (1953), The Cruel Sea (1953) and The Ladykillers (1955) are all regarded as classics of British cinema.

Owned by the BBC (1955–1995) 
The BBC bought the studios in 1955, though productions bearing the Ealing name continued to be made at the MGM British Studios at Borehamwood for two years. In 1958, Associated British Picture Corporation acquired Ealing’s parent company, Associated Talking Pictures, together with its extensive film library. The BBC based its Film Department at the studios; and at its peak 56 film crews used the studios as a base for location filming of dramas, documentaries and other programmes; shot on 16 mm and occasionally 35 mm film. Led by a director, these crews usually consisted of a Lighting Cameraman, a camera assistant, a lighting technician (known as a 'spark'), and a sound recordist. Initially these crews were equipped with Arriflex ST cameras and EMI L2 quarter inch tape recorders that had to be tethered to one another with a physical sync cable to ensure the picture and sound ran in lock. In later years, Eclair NPR cameras replaced the Arriflex machines and Nagra tape recorders replaced the EMI units. The Nagras made use of 'crystal sync', a system that provided synchronisation between the camera and the tape recorder remotely, removing the need for a physical cable. There were also over 50 cutting rooms, equipped with Steenbeck editing tables, working on every genre except News and Current Affairs. The editing suites came complete with movable film trim bins and Acmade picsyncs (picture synchronisers) for synchronising the film and sound rushes, and working with the edited cutting copy. The latter was especially useful when splitting the sound track(s) and adding additional effects, atmospheres, music and commentary tracks in readiness for film dubbing.

Many programmes came out of Ealing from Alistair Cooke's America edited by Alan Tyrer and photographed by Kenneth MacMillan to Z-Cars edited by Shelia Tomlinson and many others and Cathy Come Home edited by Roy Watts, assisted by Roger Waugh. These programmes had post production support, viewing theatres, transfer suites, dubbing theatre, maintenance; all these staff and the film crews made up what was fondly known as the TFS Family.

It was not unknown for major international film stars to visit the studios during BBC Television days. Shortly after The Eagle Has Landed (1976) was released in London on 31 March 1977, Michael Caine was present at the studios during his promotional tour for the film. Apart from the regular production staff and technicians involved with filming the associated interview, at his table in the studio canteen he was surrounded by a large entourage of followers during the obligatory break period.

In the 1980s, the BBC developed and expanded the use of electronic PSC (Portable Single Camera) location equipment and the use of 16 mm film on location gradually declined. The BBC also used the studio facilities at Ealing for filmed inserts where an electronic studio could not be used, such as for the excavation site in Quatermass and the Pit (1958–59), The White Rabbit (TV mini-series, 1967), Colditz (1972–74) and the communal sequences in Porridge (1974–77). Programmes wholly shot on film were made there also, such as Alice in Wonderland (1966), The Singing Detective (1986), Portrait of a Marriage (1986), and Fortunes of War (1987).

The BBC had preview theatres to run 16 mm sepmag film and 35 mm. The 16 mm machines were Bauer and the 35 mm projectors Kalee 21. The projection area was a long room (open plan) with projectors serving theatres E -J. There was a separate projection room in the same area for theatre K, which was 35 mm. There was also a dubbing theatre B, where 16 mm productions would be dubbed, and film dispatch and sound transfer suites, where the quarter-inch tape from Nagra tape machines would be transferred to 16 mm magnetic film. Film previews ran rushes, cutting copies, synch rushes, answer prints and transmission prints before going to telecine.

Television Film Studios was also the home before, during and after 1977, of the BBC TV Film Technical & Training Section run by the Senior Assistant, Training, Frank A. Brown. Courses were based in a lecture room at the studios, typically lasting 6 weeks, and comprised both theoretical training, with extensive information-sheet documentation being provided, plus day excursions for practical experience sessions to film cutting rooms, a film dubbing theatre and the Rank Film Laboratories at Denham (where a considerable quantity of BBC TV film programme content was processed and printed). The courses provided instruction to trainees, culminating in a written theory test, with each either being tailored to film photography, film sound or film editing skills for incoming trainees in these departments. The BBC Engineering Training Department, for training in video work and all aspects where a detailed knowledge of electronics is essential, has, alternatively, been based at Wood Norton Hall, Evesham.

With the BBC seeking to reduce costs and in particular studio facilities, a decision was taken to sell Ealing Studios on the open market. Although a sale was agreed with BBRK, the BBC inserted a buy-back clause so that in the event that BBRK (for whatever reasons) put the site up for sale then the BBC would have first option to purchase. BBRK found it necessary to sell the site and the BBC repurchased the site and sold it on for £1.00 to the National Film and Television School, (NFTS).

1995 to present 
In 1995, the studios were purchased by the NFTS and again in mid-2000 by a consortium led by Fragile Films' Uri Fruchtmann and Barnaby Thompson, Harry Handelsman and John Kao, with an intention to revive the fortunes of the studio. Handelsman's Manhattan Loft Corporation redeveloped the 3.8-acre site to include the existing Grade II listed sound stages. The studio has since begun to produce theatrical films again, such as Lucky Break (2001), The Importance of Being Earnest (2002), and Valiant (2005). Shaun of the Dead and horror film The Descent (2005) were both shot on the lot.

In 2007, Ealing revived the St Trinian's franchise, the second film, St. Trinian's, The Legend of Fritton's Gold was released in December 2009 and took over £7 million at the UK Box Office. Between these, Ealing released Easy Virtue (2008), directed by Stephan Elliott and Dorian Gray (2009), directed by Oliver Parker.

Ealing Studios is used by the Met Film School London, which has a purposely built film school on the lot and use of the studios. ITV drama Downton Abbey filmed the kitchen and servants' quarters on stages 3A and 3B.
The studio is also home to The Imaginarium, a production company and studio specializing in performance-capture, founded by Andy Serkis and Jonathan Cavendish.

Ealing Studios films

Basil Dean/ATP era

Michael Balcon era

Documentaries

BBC TV productions 
 Quatermass and the Pit (1958–59) (inserts only; programme was otherwise live)
 Doctor Who (inserts only; programme was predominantly videotaped)
 Alice in Wonderland (1966) (inserts only - stage 2 for courtroom scene)
 Civilisation (1966–69) (35mm film, shot on location around the world)
 The White Rabbit (1967)  (inserts only; programme was predominantly videotaped)
 Colditz (1972–74) (16mm film inserts only; programme was predominantly videotaped)
 Porridge (TV series) (1974–77) (16mm film inserts only; programme was predominantly videotaped)
 Oil Strike North (1975) (16mm film inserts only - stage 3A/B for oil rig exterior, using tank; programme was predominantly videotaped)
 Smiley's People (1981) (16mm film, shot at various locations)
 Bleak House (1985) (16mm film, shot at various locations)
 The Singing Detective (1986) (16mm film, shot at various locations)
 Fortunes of War (1987) (16mm film, interior scenes - otherwise shot at various locations)
 Portrait of a Marriage (1989–90) (16mm film, shot at various locations)
 An Ungentlemanly Act (1992) (16mm film, shot at various locations)

Later films 

 Notting Hill (1999)
 Lucky Break (2001)
 The Importance of Being Earnest (2002)
 Shaun of the Dead (2004)
 Valiant (2005)
 I Want Candy (2007)
 St Trinian's (2007)
 Easy Virtue (2008)
 St Trinian's 2: The Legend of Fritton's Gold (2009)
 Dorian Gray (2009)
 Burke and Hare (2010)
 I Give It a Year (2013)
 The D Train (2015)
 The Guernsey Literary and Potato Peel Pie Society (2018)
 Last Night in Soho (2021)

Independent TV 
 The Royle Family (Granada Productions for the BBC)
 Bedtime (Hat Trick Productions)
 Randall and Hopkirk (Ghost)
 Emma Brody (20th Century Fox)
 Downton Abbey – "Downstairs" scenes only (Carnival Films)
 Tour de France ITV4 (2012–2019 VSquared Productions)
 Critérium du Dauphiné ITV4 (2015–2019 VSquared Productions)
 La Vuelta ITV4 (2012–2019 VSquared Productions)
 Luck on Sunday (2017–present, Racing TV)
 Lockwood & Co. (2023-present, Netflix)

Music videos 
 "Mama" by Spice Girls
 Walk Away by Franz Ferdinand
 Talk by Coldplay
 The Drowners by Suede (US video only)
 Crazy Beat by Blur
 The Moment You Believe by Melanie C
 Champagne Supernova by Oasis

See also 
 List of Ealing Studios films
 British Film Industry

References

External links 

 
 Former BBC Film Department crew prepare to shoot a basic interview sequence on 16 mm film
 Demonstration and discussion of 16 mm cameras used at Ealing studios by former BBC Film Department cameraman
 Demonstration of a Steenbeck editing table as used in Ealing studios by BBC film editors
 Ealing Studios at screenonline.org.uk
 Ealing Studios at britmovie.co.uk
 Met Film School

Further reading 
 Forever Ealing by George Perry, published by Pavilion, 1981, ; A history of Ealing Studios from its origins in 1902.
 Ealing Studios; A Short History The Film Pilgrim, Accessed 28 February 2011

British film studios
Ealing Studios films
Media and communications in the London Borough of Ealing
Buildings and structures in the London Borough of Ealing
Film production companies of the United Kingdom
History of the London Borough of Ealing
Television studios in London
History of television in the United Kingdom
Television production companies of the United Kingdom